The United Secession Church (or properly the United Associate Synod of the Secession Church) was a Scottish Presbyterian denomination.

The First Secession from the established Church of Scotland had been in 1732, and the resultant "Associate Presbytery" grew to include 45 congregations. A series of disputes, in 1747 over the burgesses oath, and in the late 18th century over the Westminster confession, led to further splits. In 1820 two of the resulting groups, the New Licht Burghers and the New Licht Anti-Burghers, united to form the United Secession Church. It existed until 1847 when it merged with the Presbytery of Relief to form the United Presbyterian Church.

Notable members
(Other than the theological professors listed below)
 John Jamieson (died 1838)

Theological Professors

1. John Dick - Professor of Theology - 1820-1833

2. John Mitchell - Professor of Biblical Criticism (Biblical Literature from 1834) - 1825-1843

3. John Brown - Professor of Exegetical Theology - 1834-1847

4. Alexander Duncan - Professor of Pastoral Theology - 1834-1843

5. Robert Balmer - Professor of Systematic Theology - 1834-1844

6. James Harper - Professor of Pastoral Theology - 1843-1846 and Professor of Systematic Theology - 1846-1847

7. John Eadie - Professor of Biblical Literature - 1843-1847

See also
 The Marrow Controversy, which was a precursor to the First Secession

References

Presbyterianism in Scotland
Religious organizations established in 1820
1847 disestablishments
1820 establishments in Scotland